Gençay is a commune in the Vienne department in the Nouvelle-Aquitaine region in western France. The inhabitants are called Gencéens.

Geography
The village lies on the left bank of the Clouère, which forms the commune's northern border.

Twin towns
Breckerfeld, Northern Rhine-Westphalia, Germany

See also
Communes of the Vienne department

References

External links

 Office Tourisme Gençay

Communes of Vienne